The Wenjin Ge (Manchu:  šu dogon asari) is a former imperial library built in 1773 by the Qianlong Emperor of the Qing dynasty inside the Chengde Mountain Resort in Chengde, China. A copy of the Siku Quanshu was originally stored in this library.

The Wenjin Book Awards, awarded annually by the National Library of China are named after the Wenjin Ge library.

See also
Tianyi Ge
Wenyuan Ge

References 

Chengde
Buildings and structures in Hebei
Qing dynasty architecture
Libraries in Hebei
Library buildings completed in the 18th century
Government buildings completed in 1773
Libraries established in 1773